Thomas C. Stewart (1935 – 2 November 2006) was a Northern Irish footballer who played as an outside right and made one appearance through mitigating circumstances for the Northern Ireland national team.

Career
Stewart earned his first and only cap for Northern Ireland on 12 April 1961 in the 1960–61 British Home Championship against Wales. The home match, which took place in Belfast, finished as a 1–5 loss for Northern Ireland. In the summer of 1963, he played in the Eastern Canada Professional Soccer League with Hamilton Steelers.

Personal life
Stewart died on 2 November 2006 at the age of 71.

Career statistics

International

References

External links
 
 

1935 births
2006 deaths
Association footballers from Belfast
Association footballers from Northern Ireland
Northern Ireland amateur international footballers
Irish League representative players
Northern Ireland international footballers
Expatriate association footballers from Northern Ireland
Expatriate sportspeople from Northern Ireland in Canada
Expatriate soccer players in Canada
Association football outside forwards
Ballymena United F.C. players
Linfield F.C. players
Hamilton Steelers (ECPSL) players
NIFL Premiership players
Eastern Canada Professional Soccer League players